The Haunted Land: Facing Europe's Ghosts After Communism written by Tina Rosenberg and published by Random House in 1995, won the 1996 Pulitzer Prize for General Non-Fiction 
and the 1995 National Book Award for Nonfiction.

References

External links

1995 non-fiction books
History books about Europe
Books about post-Soviet Russia
Books about Europe
Pulitzer Prize for General Non-Fiction-winning works
National Book Award for Nonfiction winning works
20th-century history books